Mangelia elegantissima is an extinct species of sea snail, a marine gastropod mollusk in the family Mangeliidae.

Not to be confounded with Mangelia elegantissima (Melvill & Standen, 1903), originally described as Cythara elegantissima and now a synonym of Paraclathurella gracilenta (Reeve, 1843)

Description

Distribution
This extinct marine species was found in Miocene strata of Myanmar

References

External links
 Worldwide Mollusc Species Data Base: Mangelia elegantissima

elegantissima
Gastropods described in 1921